Whitestaunton is a village and civil parish in the South Somerset district of Somerset, England. The parish includes the hamlet of Northay. It was known simply as Staunton until the 14th century.

History

The parish of Whitestaunton was part of the South Petherton Hundred.

A Roman bath house and Edwardian folly in the village were excavated by the television series Time Team.

Whitestaunton Manor dates from the 15th century and is a Grade I listed building.

Governance
The parish council has responsibility for local issues, including setting an annual precept (local rate) to cover the council's operating costs and producing annual accounts for public scrutiny. The parish council evaluates local planning applications and works with the local police, district council officers, and neighbourhood watch groups on matters of crime, security, and traffic. The parish council's role also includes initiating projects for the maintenance and repair of parish facilities, as well as consulting with the district council on the maintenance, repair, and improvement of highways, drainage, footpaths, public transport, and street cleaning. Conservation matters (including trees and listed buildings) and environmental issues are also the responsibility of the council.

The village falls within the Non-metropolitan district of South Somerset, which was formed on 1 April 1974 under the Local Government Act 1972, having previously been part of Chard Rural District. The district council is responsible for local planning and building control, local roads, council housing, environmental health, markets and fairs, refuse collection and recycling, cemeteries and crematoria, leisure services, parks, and tourism.

Somerset County Council is responsible for running the largest and most expensive local services such as education, social services, libraries, main roads, public transport, policing and  fire services, trading standards, waste disposal and strategic planning.

It is also part of the Yeovil county constituency represented in the House of Commons of the Parliament of the United Kingdom. It elects one Member of Parliament (MP) by the first past the post system of election, and was part of the South West England constituency of the European Parliament prior to Britain leaving the European Union in January 2020, which elected seven MEPs using the d'Hondt method of party-list proportional representation.

Religious sites
The Church of St Andrew dates from the 13th century and has been designated by English Heritage as a Grade I listed building.

Notable residents
 Charles Isaac Elton (1839–1900) lawyer, antiquary, and politician.

References

External links

Villages in South Somerset
Civil parishes in Somerset